KDAZ (700 AM) is a commercial radio station in Albuquerque, New Mexico. It airs a combination of syndicated talk radio shows and Christian radio programming. It is owned by Pan American Broadcasting Co., Inc.

Weekdays, most of the shows heard on KDAZ are nationally syndicated conservative talk shows: Jesse Kelly, "Markley, Van Camp and Robbins," Howie Carr, Joe Pags, Lars Larson, Janet Parshall and Jay Sekulow.  Hourly newscasts are from Salem's Townhall Radio News. Christian programming is heard late nights and weekends, along with syndicated shows: "At Home with Gary Sullivan," "Leo Laporte, The Tech Guy" and "Fat Guys at the Movies."

KDAZ is a Class D radio station. By day, it broadcasts at 450 watts. AM 700 is a clear-channel frequency in the United States, so KDAZ must protect Class A station WLW in Cincinnati, Ohio. At night, KDAZ reduces power to 55 watts to avoid interference. Programming is also heard on FM translator K245CD at 96.9 MHz in Albuquerque.

The station first signed on as KMGM in 1959.

FM and TV simulcasts
In February 2016, a construction permit was granted by the Federal Communications Commission to move FM translator station K230BB from Fowler, Colorado, into the Albuquerque radio market on 96.9 MHz.  It would simulcast KDAZ on the FM band at 70 watts from atop Sandia Crest. The translator was licensed on October 13, 2016 as K245CD. However it had not begun broadcasting until early 2017. In December 2016 Pan American Broadcasting purchased the translator from Mountain Community Translators for $30,000. The power was upgraded from 70 watts to 160 watts in early March 2017.

KDAZ can also be heard on the Sky Angel television programming service, located on channel 9773 over satellite and channel 229 over IPTV. Audio can also be heard on television stations KCHF channel 11.5 in Santa Fe and KNMQ-LD channel 43.6 in Albuquerque.

References

External links
Sky Angel

FCC History Cards for KDAZ

DAZ
DAZ
Radio stations established in 1960
1960 establishments in New Mexico
Moody Radio affiliate stations